A Day in Black and White are a band based in Washington, DC who formed in 2001. They have been described as post-punk, post-hardcore, experimental/indie rock and even post-emo. Their sound has been compared to bands such as City of Caterpillar, Sonic Youth and Fugazi. They are currently signed to Level Plane Records.

Discography

Albums
 My Heroes Have Always Killed Cowboys (2004)
 Notes (Level Plane Records, 2005)

Split Releases
 Split w/ Silent Reminder (2003)
 Split w/ Black Castle (2004)
 Split w/ Navies (2005)
 Split w/ Golden Birds (2005)

Members
 Daniel Morse: guitar, vocals, bass
 Ian Thompson: drums
 Mike Petillo: bass
 Aaron Leitko: guitar

References

External links and references
 Level Plane Records 
 A Day in Black and White on Myspace

American post-hardcore musical groups
American screamo musical groups
Level Plane Records artists